Izack Tago (born 5 April 2002) is a Samoa international rugby league footballer who plays as a  and  for the Penrith Panthers in the NRL.

Background
Tago played his junior rugby league for the St Mary's Saints. He is of Samoan and American Samoan descent.

Playing career

2021
In round 13 of the 2021 NRL season, Tago made his first grade debut for Penrith against the Wests Tigers at Leichhardt Oval.

2022
In round 1 of the 2022 NRL season, Tago scored the first try of the year in the opening match as Penrith defeated Manly 28-6.

Tago played 26 games for Penrith in the 2022 NRL season including the clubs 2022 NRL Grand Final victory over Parramatta.

In October May was named in the Samoa squad for the 2021 Rugby League World Cup.

2023
On 18 February, Tago played in Penrith's 13-12 upset loss to St Helens RFC in the 2023 World Club Challenge.

References

External links

Penrith Panthers profile
Samoa profile

2002 births
Living people
Australian sportspeople of Samoan descent
Australian people of American Samoan descent
Australian rugby league players
Penrith Panthers players
Rugby league players from Sydney
Rugby league second-rows
Samoa national rugby league team players